Erdem Duhan Özensoy (born 1988) is a Turkish businessman and industrialist. Born in Ankara as the only son of one of Dr.Erol Ozensoy, he attended high school at Ted Ankara College. Duhan then studied at the Middle East Technical University and received his B.Sc. in Metallurgy & Materials Engineering with honors degree. Duhan is known for his works in stealth technology and low observability materials for the defence industry. He is currently a board member of Kimetsan company.

Awards 

 Duhan was rewarded "Pioneer of Chemical Industry Award" by Turkish Industrialists' and Businessmen's Foundation (TUSIAV) for his contribution to chemical industry in Turkey with Kimetsan company in 2009.
 Duhan was rewarded "Business World Award" by Turkish Economy Magazine "Ekonomize" for his innovation works in chemical industry in 2010.

Personal life 

Duhan had been a member of the International Relations Committee of Turkish School Sports Federation from 2010 till 2016.

References

External links 
 The Kimetsan Company official website
 
 
 title= TUSIAV ödülleri

1988 births
Living people
People from Ankara
Turkish businesspeople